The 2015 Seattle Reign FC season is the club's third season of play and their third season in the National Women's Soccer League, the top division of women's soccer in the United States. To accommodate the 2015 FIFA Women's World Cup, the league announced that it would reduce the season to 20 games while extending the calendar length into September and take a two-week break from June 7–19.

Review and events

Preseason 

Following a record-breaking 2014 season that saw the team winning the NWSL Shield and losing to FC Kansas City in the playoffs final, Head Coach and GM Laura Harvey expected minimal roster turnover entering into the off-season. Key contributors Nahomi Kawasumi and Beverly Goebel both returned to INAC Kobe Leonessa at the end of their season-long loans. In November, the team acquired the rights to midfielder Merritt Mathias from FC Kansas City in exchange for defender Kate Deines and the 16th and 26th draft picks in the 2015 NWSL College Draft. Two days later, Harvey added former Portland Pilots defender Michelle Cruz.

Prior to the 2015 NWSL College Draft, Harvey signed forward Beverly Yanez from Japanese club INAC Kobe Leonessa. Yanez, under her maiden name Goebel, played in Seattle on loan in 2014, scoring five goals and adding four assists while helping the Reign FC to a regular season title. A day later, NWSL announced allocated National Team players for the 2015 season, with Reign FC defenders Stephanie Cox and Carmelina Moscato removed from the list. The club expects to bring Cox back on a standard contract but has announced that Moscato will be exploring playing opportunities overseas. Then on January 16, the Harvey selected Florida Gators midfielder Havana Solaun and Stanford Cardinal defender Kendall Romine at the NWSL Draft.

In anticipation for post-World Cup fatigue for the national team players, Harvey signed Danish forward Katrine Veje on January 21. Veje will join the club on July 1 after her current contract with Brøndby IF ends. The club was also able to retain defender Stephanie Cox by signing her to a standard contract after she was removed from allocation by U.S. Soccer. To make room on the roster, Harvey waived second-year defenders Megan Brigman and Holly Hein. Additional defensive reinforcement came soon after as the club signed Scottish international Rachel Corsie from Notts County Ladies F.C. on January 29.

For the second season in a row, the Reign FC was involved in a blockbuster trade as last season's prized acquisition Sydney Leroux requested a move away from the club. On March 30, Harvey sent Leroux and Amanda Frisbie to Western New York Flash; in return, the club received midfielder Amber Brooks, WNY's first-round draft pick in the 2016 NWSL College Draft, and the rights to Leroux's international teammate Abby Wambach. Wambach had already announced that she will not play this season to concentrate on preparing for the 2015 FIFA Women's World Cup, and Harvey does not expect her to suit up for the Reign FC until 2016 at the earliest. The club then finalized its roster by signing second-round draft pick Havana Solaun on April 3.

The Reign FC headed into the regular season with a 19-player roster, with the one open spot reserved for Danish forward Katrine Veje's mid-season arrival. It includes 14 returners from last season's Shield-winning team, featuring league MVP Kim Little and fellow Best XI selections Jess Fishlock and Kendall Fletcher. Harvey hopes that the blend of returning core plus new acquisitions will help the club defend its Shield and win the playoffs this year.

Club

Coaching staff

Current roster

Competitions

Preseason

International friendlies

Regular season

Regular-season standings

Results summary

Results by matchday

Playoffs

Statistics
Numbers in parentheses denote appearances as substitute.

Awards

2015 FIFA Ballon d'Or
 FIFA Women's World Player of the Year: Megan Rapinoe, Hope Solo (nominees)
 FIFA World Coach of the Year for Women's Football: Laura Harvey (nominee)

FIFA FIFPro Women's World11
 Hope Solo

BBC Women's Footballer of the Year

 Kim Little (finalist)

NWSL season awards
Award finalists announced on September 9.
 Coach of the Year: Laura Harvey, winner
 Defender of the Year, presented by Coppertone: Lauren Barnes, finalist; Kendall Fletcher, finalist
 MVP: Jess Fishlock, finalist; Kim Little, finalist; Beverly Yanez, finalist
 Best XI: Lauren Barnes, Jess Fishlock, Kim Little, Beverly Yanez
 Second XI: Stephanie Cox, Kendall Fletcher, Megan Rapinoe, Keelin Winters

Team season awards
Announced on October 5.
 MVP: Kim Little
 Best Attacker: Beverly Yanez
 Defender of the Year: Lauren Barnes
 Unsung Hero: Keelin Winters
 Goal of the Season: Little's third goal against Houston Dash on August 21
 Best on Social Media: Haley Kopmeyer

NWSL Player of the Month
 Kim Little, June 2015.

NWSL Player of the Week
 Megan Rapinoe, Week 1.
 Jess Fishlock, Week 9.
 Beverly Yanez, Week 15.
 Kim Little, Week 19.

Gene Juarez Salons & Spas Player of the Match 
Team awards for select home matches only.
 Megan Rapinoe vs. Western New York Flash, April 12.
 Merritt Mathias vs. Washington Spirit, May 2.
 Beverly Yanez vs. China WNT, May 22.
 Jess Fishlock vs. Sky Blue FC, June 6.
 Kim Little vs. FC Kansas City, June 27.
 Beverly Yanez vs. Western New York Flash, July 11.
 Beverly Yanez vs. Portland Thorns FC, July 26.
 Rachel Corsie vs. Houston Dash, August 12.
 Megan Rapinoe vs. Boston Breakers, August 26.
 Jess Fishlock vs. Sky Blue FC, August 29.
 Beverly Yanez vs. Washington Spirit, September 13 (semi-finals).

Transfers
For transfers in, dates listed are when the Reign FC officially signed the players to the roster. Transactions where only the rights to the players are acquired (e.g., draft picks) are not listed. For transfers out, dates listed are when the Reign FC officially removed the players from its roster, not when they signed with another club. If a player later signed with another club, her new club will be noted, but the date listed here remains the one when she was officially removed from the Reign FC roster.

In

Draft picks 
Draft picks are not automatically signed to the team roster. Only those who are signed to a contract will be listed as transfers in. Only trades involving draft picks and executed during the 2015 NWSL College Draft will be listed in the notes.

Out

Offseason loans
 Rachel Corsie to Glasgow City FC
 Jess Fishlock to Melbourne City WFC (as player and assistant manager)
 Kendall Fletcher to Canberra United FC
 Haley Kopmeyer to Brisbane Roar
 Kim Little to Melbourne City WFC
 Keelin Winters to Western Sydney Wanderers FC

See also

2015 National Women's Soccer League season

References

External links 
 

OL Reign seasons
Seattle Reign
Seattle Reign
Seattle Reign
Seattle Reign